Utahloy International School may refer to:
 Utahloy International School Guangzhou
 Utahloy International School Zengcheng